Wesley Spragg (13 February 1848 – 15 August 1930) was a notable New Zealand butter manufacturer and exporter, temperance campaigner, benefactor. He was born in Madeley, Shropshire, England, in 1848.

References

1848 births
1930 deaths
New Zealand businesspeople
New Zealand temperance activists
New Zealand philanthropists
English emigrants to New Zealand
People from Madeley, Shropshire